José Varacka (27 May 1932 – 22 October 2018) was an Argentine football player and coach.

Club career
Varacka played for three of the big five teams in Argentina. He started his career in 1952 with Independiente. In 1954 he played and scored in a famous 6–0 win over Real Madrid. He joined River Plate in 1960 where he played for six seasons.

In 1966 Varacka joined San Lorenzo de Almagro and after one season with the club he would down his career at Colo-Colo in Chile and then Miraflores in Peru.

International career
Varacka played in the 1958 and 1966 editions of the FIFA World Cup. He played in the Copa América 1956 and 1959. He was also part of the Argentina national team that won the 1964 Copa de Las Naciones, played in Brazil.

Managerial career
Varacka started his managerial career with Gimnasia y Esgrima de La Plata in 1968. He went on to serve as the manager of Boca Juniors and River Plate. He won two Colombian league titles during his four spells as manager of Atlético Junior (1977 and 1980). In 1981 his Argentinos Juniors team dramatically avoided relegation on the last day of the season by beating his former team San Lorenzo 1–0, causing their relegation instead. Varacka also managed the Argentina national team in the 1974 world cup alongside Vladislao Cap.

References

External links

BDFA profile 

1932 births
2018 deaths
Argentine footballers
Argentina international footballers
1958 FIFA World Cup players
1966 FIFA World Cup players
Argentine expatriate footballers
Association football midfielders
Club Atlético Independiente footballers
Club Atlético River Plate footballers
San Lorenzo de Almagro footballers
Colo-Colo footballers
Expatriate footballers in Chile
Argentine football managers
Club de Gimnasia y Esgrima La Plata managers
Boca Juniors managers
Club Atlético Atlanta managers
Argentine people of Slovak descent
Atlético Junior managers
Millonarios F.C. managers
Argentinos Juniors managers
Club Atlético Huracán managers
Club Atlético River Plate managers
Argentine Primera División players
Expatriate football managers in Colombia
Footballers from Buenos Aires
Deportivo Pereira managers